Nathan Lane is an American actor, comedian, and writer known for his work in theater, film and television.

Lane has received six Tony Award nominations receiving three wins for his performances in Stephen Sondheim's A Funny Thing Happened on the Way to the Forum (1996), Mel Brooks' The Producers (2001), and Tony Kushner's Angels in America (2018). Lane has received eleven Drama Desk Award nominations receiving six wins, as well as two Obies, the Lucille Lortel Award and six Outer Critics Circle Awards. He also won the Olivier Award his performance on the West End stage in The Producers in London.

For his film work he has received two Golden Globe Award nominations for his performances in Mike Nichols' The Birdcage (1996) and the film adaptation of the Mel Brooks Broadway musical The Producers.He received one Screen Actors Guild Award winning for Outstanding Ensemble for The Birdcage (1996) and the National Board of Review Award also winning for Outstanding Ensemble for Nicholas Nickleby.

For his work on television he has received Lane has also received various awards for his work on television including a Primetime Emmy Award, two Daytime Emmy Awards, and the People's Choice Award.

Theater accolades

Tony Awards

Drama Desk Awards

Olivier Awards

Television Awards

Emmy Awards

Hollywood Critics Association TV Awards

Film accolades

Golden Globe Award

Screen Actors Guild Award

Miscellaneous awards

References 

Lane, Nathan